The 2007 World Orienteering Championships, the 24th World Orienteering Championships, were held in Kyiv, Ukraine, 18 –26 August 2007.

The championships had eight events; sprint for men and women, middle distance for men and women, long distance (formerly called individual or classic distance) for men and women, and relays for men and women.

Medalists

References 

World Orienteering Championships
2007 in Ukrainian sport
International sports competitions hosted by Ukraine
August 2007 sports events in Europe
Orienteering in Europe
Sports competitions in Kyiv
2000s in Kyiv